Julian "Jules" De Martino (born 16 July 1967) is an English musician and a member of the pop duo The Ting Tings.

Early life
De Martino was born in West Ham, the son of Northern Irish mother, Rosemary (née Middleton), and Italian father, Benito De Martino. Jules has one older sister, Maria. He began playing drums at the age of 13.

Musical projects

Babakoto
When he was 17, De Martino was the drummer and songwriter in a band called Babakoto (the babakoto is a rare lemur from Madagascar), who once played as a backing group for Bros and released a single at the end of 1987 called "Just to Get By", which failed to chart.

Mojo Pin
After Babakoto broke up De Martino became the lead singer in another indie band called Mojo Pin, named after the first song on Jeff Buckley's 1994 album Grace.  Mojo Pin released two singles, "You" in 1995 and "My Imagination" in 1996.

TKO
In March 2001 Katie White's father David White brought in De Martino as a songwriter and he wrote four songs for her group TKO (Technical Knock Out).

Dear Eskiimo
De Martino moved to Manchester and formed a band with Katie White and DJ Simon Templeman which they called Dear Eskiimo (often misreported as Dead Eskimo).  The name was intended to be as nomadic, tribal and independent as possible. There were already several bands called Eskimo but De Martino, who wrote the lyrics, wanted his songs to tell good stories as if in a letter, hence 'Dear Eskiimo' with the odd spelling of 'eskimo" with two 'I"s to make it stand out. Their first performance was as a support between two rock bands. They were signed up by Mercury Records at the end of 2004. Creative differences and the management style of the record label caused them to split up.

The Ting Tings

In 2007, De Martino and White started a duo with White on vocals, guitar and bass drum and De Martino on vocals, drums, bass, guitar, and keyboards. They started writing songs together and performing short concerts.  White was working in a boutique with a Chinese girl called Ting Ting, which sounds like Mandarin Chinese for band stand (亭) and White used it as name for the band. One transliteration of the band's name in Japanese is a slang word for penis (wikt:ちんちん). The Ting Tings started by playing for private parties at the Islington Mill arts centre in Salford and their debut album, We Started Nothing, was released on 19 May 2008.

Personal life
In a February 2022 BBC interview, De Martino and White spoke of their 20-month-old daughter and personal relationship: "The pair have previously avoided saying whether they are romantic as well as musical partners. 'We never particularly spoke about it,' the singer says. 'We always wanted to keep it quite separate from the music, but it's quite hard when you have literally a mini person. We've been together a long time now.'"

References

1969 births
Living people
English drummers
English male guitarists
English male singer-songwriters
English people of Irish descent
English people of Maltese descent
People from Kirkby Stephen
Rhythm guitarists